Dharamsala Days, Dharamsala Nights by Pauline Macdonald is a non-fiction work set in Mcloed Ganj, India, in a Tibetan refugee camp.  The book depicts the life Tibetan new arrivals experience in India.

References

Further reading
 

History books about ethnic groups
Books about refugees